The 2022 NHL Stadium Series was an outdoor regular season National Hockey League (NHL) game, part of the Stadium Series of games. The game took place on February 26, 2022, at Nissan Stadium in Nashville, Tennessee, with the Nashville Predators hosting the Tampa Bay Lightning. This was the first NHL outdoor game for the Lightning and the second for the Predators.

Background
The NHL originally announced on February 15, 2020, that the 2021 Stadium Series would be hosted by the Carolina Hurricanes at Carter–Finley Stadium. After he took majority control of the team in 2018, Hurricanes owner Thomas Dundon made it a goal to have his  club play in its first outdoor game. In 2019, Dundon invited NHL Commissioner Gary Bettman to take a tour of Carter–Finley Stadium to see if it was feasible. Before the league could finalize the game, the Hurricanes had to seek additional funding from the local government and other organizations to help offset the cost of hosting the game.

The NHL delayed the start of the 2020–21 season to January 2021, due to the COVID-19 pandemic having forced the 2019–20 playoffs to conclude in late September. On October 22, 2020, the NHL postponed both the 2021 NHL Winter Classic and the 2021 All-Star Game due to "ongoing uncertainty" since both January events rely on fan participation. The decision to further postpone the Stadium Series game was made on December 23.

The Hurricanes later asked the league to move their outdoor game to the 2022–23 season, with team president and general manager Don Waddell stating that he wanted "to assure a safe environment." On June 28, 2021, the league announced that the 2022 game would instead take place at Nissan Stadium in Nashville, Tennessee, with the Nashville Predators hosting to the Tampa Bay Lightning.

Game summary
The Tampa Bay Lightning defeated the Nashville Predators 3-2, with Lightning captain Steven Stamkos receiving the first star of the game, with one goal and two assists. At 1:19 of the first period, Ryan Johansen illegally checked Erik Cernak to the head that would result in Cernak not returning for the last two periods of the game and Johansen receiving a minor penalty, reduced from what was originally a major penalty. Tanner Jeannot scored the first goal of the game for the Predators during a power play at 8:20, scoring the only goal of the period. Early in the second period, Brayden Point put the Lightning on the board with a power play goal at 0:58. The Lightning would score again this period on another power play, with Nikita Kucherov scoring at 6:18 to make it 2-1. At 11:31 of the third period, Cal Foote fed the puck to Steven Stamkos who slap shots it into the net, making the score 3-1. Later in the period at 12:29, the Filip Forsberg scores a power play goal to make it 3-2. The Predators could not tie the game with an empty net, and the Lightning prevail with a final score of 3-2. Tampa Bay goalie Andrei Vasilevskiy made 26 saves in the win, while Nashville goalie Juuse Saros made 30 saves. There was only one even strength goal of the entire game.

Number in parentheses represents the player's total in goals or assists to that point of the season

Team rosters

 Brian Elliott and David Rittich dressed as the back-up goaltenders.  Neither entered the game.

Scratches
Tampa Bay Lightning: Boris Katchouk, Andrej Šustr
Nashville Predators: Mark Borowiecki, Alexandre Carrier, Matt Tennyson

Entertainment
Country singer Dustin Lynch performed the song "Party Mode" during team introductions. He was accompanied by the Vanderbilt Spirit dance team. Singer Jessie James Decker sang the national anthem. Country singers Miranda Lambert and Dierks Bentley performed during the first intermission. Dierks Bentley performed the songs "Burning Man" and "I Hold On". Miranda Lambert performed the songs "Drunk (And I Don't Wanna Go Home)" and "Kerosene". Bentley and Lambert also sang the song "Gimme All Your Lovin'" together in a duet.

Broadcasting
The game was broadcast nationally in the United States by TNT. With it being scheduled for a Saturday night, the game will air north of the border under the Hockey Night in Canada banner on Sportsnet.

References

NHL Stadium Series
Stadium Series
Nashville Predators games
Tampa Bay Lightning games
NHL Stadium Series
2022 in sports in Tennessee
21st century in Nashville, Tennessee
Sports competitions in Nashville, Tennessee
Ice hockey competitions in Tennessee